Earlie Endris Thorpe (November 9, 1924 - January 30, 1989) was a professor of history, an author, and clergyman in the United States. He lived in Durham, North Carolina and was a professor at North Carolina Central University for about 27 years. Duke University has a collection of his papers and correspondence.

He and his wife, Martha Vivian Branc, had two daughters: Rita Harrington and Gloria Earl.

Legacy
Marcus P. Nevius delivered the 30th Annual Earl E. Thorpe Memorial Lecture at North Carolina Central University in 2020.

Writings
"Negro Historiography in the United States", dissertation
Negro Historians in the United States (1958)
The Desertion of Man: A Critique of Philosophy of History (1958)
The Mind of the Negro: An Intellectual History of Afro-Americans (1961)
Eros and Freedom in Southern Life and Thought (1967)
The Central Theme of Black History (1969)
"The Black Experience in America" editor, ten-booklet series
Struggle for a nation's conscience : the civil rights movement
Pioneers and Planters; Black Beginnings in America with Joseph Penn, American Education Publications (1971)
The Old South: A Psychohistory (1972)
"Black history and the organic perspective : an essay to introduce the directory and bibliography no. 870-872" (1975)
"The uses of Black history : a speech delivered during the observance of Black History Week", February 11, 1980
African Americans and the Sacred: Spirituals, Slave Religion, and Symbolism (1982)
Slave Religion, Spirituals, and C. J. Jung (1983)
A Concise History of North Carolina Central University (1984)

References

1924 births
1989 deaths